A sliding T bevel, also known as a bevel gauge or false square is an adjustable gauge for setting and transferring angles. Different from the square, which is fixed and can only set a 90° angle, the sliding T bevel can set any angle and transfer it on another piece.

The bevel gauge is composed of two elements connected with a thumbscrew or wing nut, which allows the blade to pivot and be locked at any angle. The handle is usually made of wood or plastic and the blade of metal. The bevel can be used to duplicate an existing angle, or set to a desired angle by using it with any number of other measuring tools (such as a protractor, or framing square).

See also
Bevel

References

Sources
Reader's Digest "Book of Skills & Tools"

Angle
Dimensional instruments
Woodworking measuring instruments